Lochboisdale is the main village and port on the island of South Uist, Outer Hebrides, Scotland. Lochboisdale is within the parish of South Uist, and is situated on the shore of Loch Baghasdail at the southern end of the A865.

History
The town profited from the herring boom in the 19th century, and a steamer pier was built in 1880. In 1905, a mission church was built, and by 1953, steamers were connecting Lochboisdale with Oban, Castlebay, Mallaig and Lochmaddy.

Economy
Lochboisdale is the ferry terminal for the island of South Uist, with regular vehicle ferry services to Mallaig and, in the winter, Oban. The pier area has undergone a transformation; the old shop and surrounding buildings were either renovated or removed to provide new housing and commercial units for rent.

Lochboisdale Hotel, built in the late 19th century as a fishing hotel, is adjacent to the ferry terminal.

The whole village is within walking distance of the pier, and has a post office with a coffee shop and internet café. A bank (RBS) branch is also present in the village and has a 24h ATM, although the branch itself is only open once a week. By the pier is an all-purpose store called Fàilte (meaning welcome in the local Gaelic language).

Lochboisdale Development Limited have recently opened a new harbour on the small island of Gasaigh. The harbour provides many facilities. Mooring licences are available for day visiting, monthly and seasonal berths, with inclusive use of the quayside facilities, WiFi, showers and laundry.

Ferry service

Trivia
London-based restaurant chain Boisdale is named after Lochboisdale, having been founded in 1987 by Ranald Macdonald, the eldest son of the 24th Chief of Clanranald.

References

External links

 Comann Seolaidh Lochbaghasdail (sailing club)
 Lochboisdale Hotel
 Lochboisdale Coffee Shop/Cafe

Villages on South Uist